Hugo Miguel Magalhães Évora (born 17 February 1981 in Queluz, Lisbon) is a Cape Verdean retired footballer who played as either a central defender or a left back.

External links

1981 births
Living people
People from Queluz, Portugal
Portuguese people of Cape Verdean descent
Citizens of Cape Verde through descent
Footballers from Lisbon
Cape Verdean footballers
Association football defenders
Liga Portugal 2 players
Segunda Divisão players
G.D. Estoril Praia players
S.C. Olhanense players
C.D. Santa Clara players
C.D. Olivais e Moscavide players
Liga I players
Liga II players
CSM Ceahlăul Piatra Neamț players
Girabola players
Progresso Associação do Sambizanga players
Cape Verde international footballers
Cape Verdean expatriate footballers
Expatriate footballers in Portugal
Expatriate footballers in Romania
Expatriate footballers in Angola
Cape Verdean expatriate sportspeople in Romania